The 1992 Stanley Cup Finals was the championship series of the National Hockey League's (NHL) 1991–92 season, and the culmination of the 1992 Stanley Cup playoffs. It was contested by the Prince of Wales Conference and defending Stanley Cup champion Pittsburgh Penguins and the Clarence Campbell Conference champion Chicago Blackhawks. The Blackhawks were appearing in their first Finals since . After the Blackhawks jumped to an early 4–1 lead in the first game of the series, Mario Lemieux and the Penguins came back to win the game, sweep the series in four games, and win their second consecutive and second overall Stanley Cup. The fourth and final game of this series was the first time a Stanley Cup playoff game was played in the month of June and at the time it was the latest finishing date for an NHL season. This was also the last Finals to be played at Chicago Stadium as it closed in 1994.

Paths to the Finals

Pittsburgh defeated the Washington Capitals 4–3, the New York Rangers 4–2, and the Boston Bruins 4–0.

Chicago had to defeat their three biggest rivals, first the St. Louis Blues 4–2, then their long-time Original Six rival Detroit Red Wings 4–0, and then, the Edmonton Oilers 4–0.

With their co-tenants at Chicago Stadium, the Bulls, coached by Phil Jackson and led by Michael Jordan, playing in (and winning) the NBA Finals, it was an opportunity for both the Blackhawks and the Bulls to help the city of Chicago become the first city to have both NHL and NBA championships in the same year. (New York also had this opportunity in 1994, when the Knicks and Rangers made the finals in their respective sport; however, the result was the same, albeit a reversal of Chicago's ending, as the Rangers won their first Stanley Cup since 1940, and the Knicks lost, with both of those series going the full seven games.)

Chicago set an NHL playoff record in winning 11 games in a row to reach the finals.

Pittsburgh had won seven in a row entering the finals and swept Chicago in four games to tie Chicago's record. Pittsburgh then extended the playoff winning streak record to 14 with wins in the first three games against the New Jersey Devils in the following season's first playoff round.

Game summaries
The Penguins were led by captain Mario Lemieux, coach Scotty Bowman, and goaltender Tom Barrasso. The Blackhawks were led by captain Dirk Graham, head coach Mike Keenan and goaltender Ed Belfour. They also made history in having the first Russian-born player to have a chance to get their name on the Stanley Cup in Igor Kravchuk.

Game one

In the opening game of the 1992 Stanley Cup Finals, the Pittsburgh Penguins overcame deficits of 3–0 in the first period and 4–1 halfway through the second period to win by a score of 5–4. This was the first victory from a three-goal deficit in the Finals since 1944

Six minutes into the game, the Blackhawks' forecheck drew a penalty against Pittsburgh. Right off the subsequent face-off, Chris Chelios scored the first goal of the Stanley Cup Finals on a wrist shot. After surviving a Pittsburgh powerplay, the Blackhawks' aggressive offensive-zone strategy would lead to two more Blackhawks goals within a 26-second window. First, Michel Goulet converted a takeaway on the boards in the Penguins' zone to make it 2–0, then Dirk Graham scored on a rebound with the shot by Chelios. Pittsburgh got on the board after Igor Kravchuk got penalized for holding and Phil Bourque scored on a wraparound after Blackhawks goalkeeper Ed Belfour lost his stick. Chicago subsequently extended their lead to 4–1 via a two-on-one breakaway from Steve Larmer to Brent Sutter, who beat Tom Barrasso under his left leg. Just as their powerplay from Chicago's too-many-men penalty expired, Rick Tocchet deflected a shot from Paul Stanton into the Chicago net. Then, on the Penguins' next rush, Kevin Stevens drew several Blackhawks on him, which gave Mario Lemieux room to bank the puck off the Ed Belfour's leg, decreasing the deficit to 4–3. After fifteen minutes in the third, the Penguins would equalize the score. Aided by a pick on a Pittsburgh defender by Shawn McEachern, Jaromir Jagr deked around three Blackhawks, charging into the crease starting from the boards, and beat Belfour on a backhand shot to tie the game at 4–4 with 4:55 remaining in the third period. After both Mike Hudson for the Blackhawks and Lemieux for the Penguins drew penalties while charging the offensive zone against two opposing defenders, almost exactly two minutes apart, the game seemed poised to go into overtime with Pittsburgh playing with a one-man advantage. However, on an offensive-zone face-off to start the Pittsburgh powerplay, Mario Lemieux charged the Blackhawks' net from the weak side and put a rebound off a shot by Larry Murphy past Belfour. Pittsburgh's first lead of the game thus came with thirteen seconds remaining in the game. The Penguins held off the Blackhawks to win game one, 5–4.

Game two

In game two, nearly ten minutes into the game, Bob Errey scored the first goal for Pittsburgh shorthanded. In the second period, after denying Lemieux his scoring chance, Bryan Marchment trailed the subsequent play into the Pittsburgh zone and then won a physical battle against Larry Murphy. On a seemingly broken play he put the puck past Tom Barrasso into the Pittsburgh goal to tie the game at 1–1. However, Marchment was called for an elbow check and Mario Lemieux scored on a one timer set up by Rick Tocchet, 43 seconds into the ensuing powerplay. Two-and-a-half minutes later, Brian Marchment, who had been the catalyst for Chicago's lone goal, was beaten on the boards by Rick Tocchet. Tocchet again fed Lemieux in the slot, and another one timer extended the Pittsburgh lead to 3–1. The Penguins then limited the Blackhawks shots to four in the third period to take Game 2 3–1.

Game three

In game three, the Blackhawks put up more offensive pressure on the Penguins. Pittsburgh instead shut out the Blackhawks, with Tom Barrasso stopping all 27 shots in the three periods. The lone goal came from Kevin Stevens putting his team into a 3–0 series lead.

Game four

After the series saw a total of just one goal over the course of 86 minutes of hockey spanning from the second period of game two to the early moments of game four, the two teams erupted for an eleven-goal outburst in game four, which was the first NHL game played in the month of June. There were four goals scored in the first seven minutes of the game, and five in the first eleven, with the first period ending with a score of 3–3. The lasting image of the opening stanza was perhaps the sea of hats on the ice after Blackhawks captain Dirk Graham recorded a hat trick by accounting for all three of Chicago's goals. Pittsburgh's goals were scored by Jaromir Jagr after Ed Belfour turned over the puck behind his goal; by Kevin Stevens on a one-handed backhand wrist shot that was deemed "stoppable" by TV analyst Bill Clement (and sparked the change in goal); and by Mario Lemieux on a rebound off a shot from Larry Murphy, which had been set up by Lemieux. Graham scored his hat trick to answer each of these goals on a rebound off his own backhand shot and two one-timers after he was left alone at the Pittsburgh crease in both instances. There were two goals scored in the second period – one on each side – to make the score 4–4. Pittsburgh's tally came just 58 seconds into the period, when Rick Tocchet was left alone after the Blackhawks neglected to defend the area near the crease. With less than five minutes to go in the second period, the Blackhawks immediately scored a goal to tie the game for the fourth time, when Jeremy Roenick deflected a shot by Brian Noonan off Murphy's leg. The proverbial floodgates would, however, open almost exactly five minutes into the final period, when the Penguins scored twice in just over three minutes. At first, a shoulder check by Mario Lemieux against Chris Chelios behind the Chicago goal set up a wrist shot by Larry Murphy through traffic, which went past Hasek for a 5–4 Pittsburgh lead. Then Ron Francis converted a slapshot in a two-on-one situation to give Pittsburgh its first two-goal lead of the game. Chicago would come closer once more, when Jeremy Roenick scored at the 11:18 mark to make it 6–5 Pittsburgh after Larry Murphy tripped behind his own goal, just over three minutes after the second Pittsburgh goal of the period. Just a minute later, Chris Chelios hit the goal post, and the Roenick-Chelios pair would also sustain pressure in the final minute of the game with Chicago playing with an empty net. Overall however, Pittsburgh still controlled most stretches of these final eight minutes, as they didn't have trouble getting out of their zone. Pittsburgh finished the game 6–5 earning their second Stanley Cup. Mario Lemieux was given the Conn Smythe Trophy as the MVP of the playoffs.

Broadcasting
In Canada, the series was televised in English on the CBC and in French on SRC.

In the United States, this was the last Stanley Cup Finals to air nationally on SportsChannel America. ESPN would pick up the national U.S. contract for the next season.

SportsChannel America's national coverage was blacked out in the Chicago and Pittsburgh areas due to the local rights to Blackhawks and Penguins games in those respective TV markets. SportsChannel Chicago aired the games in Chicago. In Pittsburgh, KBL televised games one and two while KDKA aired games three and four.

Team rosters
Years indicated in boldface under the "Finals appearance" column signify that the player won the Stanley Cup in the given year.

Chicago Blackhawks

Pittsburgh Penguins

Stanley Cup engraving
The 1992 Stanley Cup was presented to Penguins captain Mario Lemieux by NHL President John Ziegler following the Penguins 6–5 win over the Blackhawks in game four. It was the last of 15 Stanley Cup presentations presided over by Ziegler; this duty passed to Commissioner Gary Bettman the next season. 

The following Penguins players and staff had their names engraved on the Stanley Cup

1991–92 Pittsburgh Penguins

Aftermath
The Penguins won a league record 17-straight games en route to the Presidents' Trophy in the  season, despite Mario Lemieux missing much of the season to Hodgkin's lymphoma. Their chances at a three-peat ended when they lost in the Patrick Division final to the New York Islanders in seven games. The Penguins wouldn't return to the finals again until 2008, when they lost to the Detroit Red Wings.

The Blackhawks, however, got swept in the first round to the St. Louis Blues, 4–0. The Blackhawks would not return to the Stanley Cup Finals until 2010, when they defeated the Penguins' cross-state rivals, the Philadelphia Flyers, in six games.

See also
 1991–92 NHL season
 List of Stanley Cup champions
 1991–92 Chicago Blackhawks season
 1991–92 Pittsburgh Penguins season

Notes

References
 
 
 

1992 Stanley Cup
Chicago Blackhawks games
Pittsburgh Penguins games
Stanley Cup Finals
Stanley Cup
May 1992 sports events in the United States
June 1992 sports events in the United States
Ice hockey competitions in Chicago
1990s in Chicago
1992 in sports in Illinois
1990s in Pittsburgh
1992 in sports in Pennsylvania
Ice hockey competitions in Pittsburgh